The molecular form C12H22O11 (molar mass: 342.29 g/mol, exact mass : 342.116212) may refer to:

 Disaccharides
 Allolactose
 Cellobiose
 Galactose-alpha-1,3-galactose
 Gentiobiose (amygdalose)
 Isomaltose
 Isomaltulose
 Kojibiose
 Lactose (milk sugar)
 Lactulose
 Laminaribiose
 Maltose (malt sugar - cereal)
 2α-Mannobiose
 3α-Mannobiose
 Melibiose
 Melibiulose
 Nigerose
 Sophorose
 Sucrose (table sugar)
 Trehalose
 Trehalulose
 Turanose